Gaflenz is a market town in the Steyr-Land district of the Austrian state of Upper Austria. It is known for its saws and its gothic-style St. Andreas Parish Church, established in 1494.

Population

International partnerships 
Gaflenz is twinned with:
  Clemency, Luxembourg

References

External links
 Gaflenz in the AEIOU encyclopedia

Cities and towns in Steyr-Land District